Phyllophaga vexata is a species of scarab beetle in the family Scarabaeidae.

Subspecies
These two subspecies belong to the species Phyllophaga vexata:
 Phyllophaga vexata unituberculata Bates, 1889
 Phyllophaga vexata vexata (Horn, 1885)

References

Further reading

 

Melolonthinae
Articles created by Qbugbot
Beetles described in 1885